Louise A. Fitch (October 18, 1914 – September 11, 1996) was an American actress best known for her work in old-time radio.

Early years 
Fitch was born into a Yiddish-speaking family in Omaha, Nebraska, to Leo (Lev) Fitch (1884–1947) and Fannie (Frieda) Riekes Fitch (1896–1960), Jewish immigrants from Ukraine and Russia, respectively. She grew up in Council Bluffs, Iowa, where she received her elementary and secondary education. While she was a student at Creighton University, Fitch was a beauty queen, editor of the school's newspaper, and the school's best violinist. She initially majored in journalism, planning to go into that profession, but opportunities for acting changed her mind. Participation in Creighton's dramatics society helped Fitch to develop her acting skills, and her debut on stage came unexpectedly when she had to go on for a leading lady who became sick. She gained additional experience by acting with a stock theater company throughout her college years.

Radio
Fitch first worked in radio as a copywriter for station KOIL in Omaha, Nebraska, for five months. Her entry into acting on radio came by accident when she visited a friend who was an announcer at a station in Chicago. A director mistakenly had her audition for a part, leading her to be cast as Nancy in That Brewster Boy.

Fitch's roles on radio programs included those shown in the table below.

By late 1937, Fitch had rejected two offers to act in films, preferring to remain in radio.

Hollywood Blacklist 
Fitch was an actress in the 1950s that took on roles such as Blood of Dracula and I Was a Teenage Werewolf. During this time period, McCarthyism and the Red Scare were circulating. With the fear of Communism during the Cold War, Senator Joseph McCarthy claimed that he had a list of confirmed communists in the United States. This list affected politicians, blue collar workers, and actors/actresses such as Fitch herself. "The Red Channels" in which was a pamphlet written that gave a list of people in show business who had potential communist ties. This pamphlet created the Hollywood Blacklist that Fitch was placed on Hundreds of others in show business were Blacklisted and were not able to get jobs, having to testify in front of the HUAC These people were given the option to give the name of another communist or remain silent and be placed on the blacklist.

Television
Fitch played Nurse Bascomb on the CBS drama Medical Center.
Fitch played Mrs. Deutch on Hart to Hart "As the Hart Turns", and Mrs. Ballard on Magnum, P.I. episode "Ghost Writer".

Film
Under the name of Louise Lewis, she also appeared in Cassavetes' movie Opening Night.

Personal life
Fitch married attorney Jerome Rosenthal in 1938.

Death
On September 11, 1996, Fitch died in Los Angeles at age 81.

References

1914 births
1996 deaths
American radio actresses
American television actresses
20th-century American actresses
20th-century American Jews
Jewish American actresses
American people of Russian-Jewish descent
American people of Ukrainian-Jewish descent